Ånden Som Gjorde Opprør (lit. The Spirit Who Rebelled) is the second full-length album by Norwegian solo artist Mortiis that was released in 1994, a year after his debut album, Født til å Herske, and is the predecessor to Keiser Av En Dimensjon Ukjent. The album was released on CD and gatefold LP formats, with the latter being limited to 300 copies, which came with posters and postcards. The album was later reissued as a picture disc.

On January 9, 2007, the CD was reissued on Projekt Records. It was also issued as a gatefold LP, limited to 300 numbered copies, with posters and four postcards. The record was later issued by DDM as a picture disc, with three different pressruns of about 300 copies each.

The album was reworked and rerecorded for 2020 release Spirit of Rebellion. The project was instigated after Mortiis was invited to perform at the 25th anniversary celebrations for former label Cold Meat Industry in 2017, whereupon he decided to revisit the 1994 release with an updated sound.

Track listing
"En Mørk Horisont" (A Dark Horizon)  – 21:09
"Visjoner Av En Eldgammel Fremtid" (Vision Of An Ancient Future)  – 18:27

References

Mortiis albums
1994 albums